The royal knifefish or Indochina featherback, Chitala blanci, is a species of ray-finned fish in the family Notopteridae found in the Mekong basin in Cambodia, Laos, Thailand and Vietnam.

In the aquarium
The royal knifefish, often sold as the royal clown knifefish, is occasionally sold in the aquarium trade.

References

Chitala
Fish of Southeast Asia
Near threatened animals
Fish described in 1965
Taxonomy articles created by Polbot